Oleg Vasilyevich Matytsin (born 19 May 1964) is a Russian professor and doctor of Pedagogical Sciences, Corresponding Member of Russian Academy of Education and Honoured Doctor of Beijing Sport University. He is currently Minister of Sport of Russia since 2020 and President of the International University Sports Federation (FISU) since 2015. He is also a member of the Presidential Council of the Russian Federation for the Development of Physical Culture and Sport, a member of the International Fair Play Committee, and Honorary President of the Russian Students Sport Union (RSSU). Before becoming President of FISU, Matytsin played a crucial role in the development of the European University Sports Federation (EUSA), serving as Vice-President from 2007 to 2015.

Education 
Matytsin graduated from the State Central Order of Lenin Institute of Physical Education (now the Russian State University of Physical Education, Sport, Youth and Tourism) in 1985, specialising in physical culture and sport. In 1990, he received a postgraduate degree from the same university. 
In 1991, Matytsin graduated from the Beijing Sport University. 
In 2006, he graduated from the Russian Academy of Public Service under the President of the Russian Federation (now the Russian Presidential Academy of National Economy and Public Administration), receiving a diploma in State and Municipal Management.

Sporting achievements 

Matytsin started his table tennis career in 1975 in Moscow, Russia and played for the USSR university sports society "Burevestnik".  He went on to receive his Master of Sport for table tennis from the USSR in 1980, became a member of the USSR national junior team (1980-1982) and won the USSR Table Tennis Cup in 1983. He was also a medalist at the USSR Spartakiad (1983) and the 1984 USSR Championship.

He later headed the Russian State Academy of Physical Education table tennis team, which won both the 1988 and 1990 USSR Universiades.  He was also head coach of the Russian university table tennis team that participated at the 1992 World University Championship in Lyon, France.  Matytsin was named Honored Trainer of the Russian Federation in 1997.

University career 

Matytsin worked as a lecturer for the Russian State University of Physical Education, Sport, Youth and Tourism (from 1986-to 1996) and later went on to develop his career within the institution.  In 1996 he became Dean of the Individual Professional Education Faculty and continued in this role until he was promoted to vice-rector in 1999. He was then rector from 2001 to 2006.

From 2006 until 2015, Matytsin was President of the Russian State University of Physical Education, Sport, Youth and Tourism.

Matytsin's research field was psychology and pedagogy of sport. He has authored more than 80 scientific publications, including two monographs and five manuals.

RSSU Presidency 

Matytsin became President of the RSSU in 2005.  Under his leadership, a Russian Student Sport Festival was launched in 2009 and biannual Russian Summer and Winter Universiades were successfully renewed. 
During his time as president, he cooperated with international university sports organisations to secure international sports and educational events for the Russian Federation.

From 2009 to 2013, Matytsin was Deputy Chairman of the Kazan 2013 Universiade Organising Committee. The Russian Student Sport Union played a key part in organising the Summer Universiade, which was a great success. The event  broke records in terms of number of participants (almost 12,000), sports (27) and medal events (351).

Following Kazan's success, Matytsin became one of the founders of the FISU International Educational Centre in the Volga Region State Academy of Physical Culture, Sport and Tourism. The centre aims to promote the ideas and values of international student sport by using innovative educational platforms, providing high quality training in the field of university sport, conducting research activities and creating sustainable Universiade legacies.

Matytsin also played a key role in Krasnoyarsk's nomination as a candidate for the winter Universiade in 2019, with the city eventually chosen by FISU  9 November 2013. Matytsin has been the Deputy Chairman of the Krasnoyarsk 2019 Organising Committee.

Since 2014, Matytsin's work as leader of his national university sports federation (NUSF) received recognition from both the IOC and FISU. In 2010, RSSU was awarded the IOC trophy for "Sport - Inspiring Young People" and in 2015 RSSU was named the "Best NUSF" by FISU.

After becoming President of FISU, Matytsin relinquished his term at the RSSU and was succeeded by Sergey Seyranov.  Matytsin remains Honorary President of the RSSU.

FISU Presidency  
Matytsin became President of FISU  in November 2015

Prior to becoming president, Matytsin served four years as First Vice-President of FISU.
Under Matytsin's leadership, FISU is set to develop a strategic plan to guide its operations over the next 10 years. This will define FISU's strategic goals and act as a detailed roadmap for achieving them. The strategy is dictated by FISU's vision, which is "to create a world where university sport has positively shaped the majority of leaders in society".

Following the CAS decision in the case of WADA vs RUSADA, Matytsin vacated the FISU Presidency on 23 March 2021 until 17 December 2022. Leonz Eder serves as the Acting President.

Political career 
On 21 January 2020, Matytsin was appointed Minister of Sport of Russia in the Mikhail Mishustin's Cabinet.

Honorary titles 

 1997 – Honoured Trainer of the Russian Federation
 1980 - Master of Sports of the USSR in table tennis
 2002 - Corresponding Member of the Imperial Saint Petersburg Academy of Sciences.
 2005 – Honorary Doctor of the National Sports Academy of Bulgaria NSA"Vasill Levski"
 2005 – Honorary Doctor of Beijing Sport University
 2015- Doctor Honoris Causa Lithuanian Sports of Lithuanian Sports University

Awards 

 The Order of Friendship
 Medal "In Commemoration of the 1000th anniversary of Kazan"
 Medal "In Commemoration of the 850th anniversary of Moscow"
 Breastplate "Honoured Worker of Higher Professional Education of the Russian Federation"
 Medal from the Russian Olympic Committee "For Merit in the Development of Olympic Movement in Russia"
 Medal from the Ministry of Sport of the Russian Federation “For Merit in the Development of Physical Culture and Sport”
 Breastplate from the Ministry of Internal Affairs of the Russian Federation "For merit in service"
 Petr Lesgaft Medal

References

Notes

1964 births
Living people
Russian referees and umpires
Russian male table tennis players
21st-century Russian politicians
Russian State University of Physical Education, Sport, Youth and Tourism alumni